The Association of Guides and Scouts of Chile (AGSCH) began in 1978 when the Scout Association of Chile (ASCH) and the Girl Guides Association of Chile (AGCH) combined. It is affiliated with the World Association of Girl Scouts (WAGGGS) and the World Scout Movement (WOSM). This connection allows the Association to participate in major global programs related to health, nutrition, world peace, environmental protection and integration of disabled into society, among other social issues of concern to the Association. Additionally, the affiliation grants the Association consultative status with the United Nations on matters concerning childhood and youth, and also membership in the Scout Parliamentary Union, consisting in Chile of more than thirty members.

History
In 1909, the second Scout Association in the world was founded in Chile. It was inspired by the direct influence of Robert Baden-Powell who visited the country that same year. The founder of the Chilean Scouting movement was Alcibíades Vicencio. The Girl Guide Association of Chile was founded in 1935. After a long process, the two national associations, the Chilean Scout Association and the Catholic Scout Federation merged in 1978 to form the Asociación de Guías y Scouts de Chile.

The Asociación de Guías y Scouts de Chile hosted the 19th World Jamboree at Picarquín in December 1999. This was the first World Jamboree in South America. Scouts de Chile hosted about 30,000 Scouts with 1,343 Chilean staff and 5,625 Chilean Scouts participating.

Program
Scouting in Chile has been a forerunner in social projects. The Asociación de Guías y Scouts de Chile have a center in the south, where they are involved in assisting poor children by providing meals, clothes and help with schooling. The ultimate goal of this project is to improve the conditions to the point where the children will be able to return home.

There is also a project in the poorer sections of Santiago. Several Scout groups have been formed for very poor children, giving them a meal a day and helping them to learn Scouting skills that will lead them to improve their living conditions. Programs have been established for disabled children. Scouts help with disaster relief. After one earthquake, Scouts took charge of shelters caring for thousands of victims.

Sections

Lobatos/Golondrinas
(Cubs/Brownies) - ages 7 to 11
 Motto: "Siempre Mejor" (Always Better)

A Lobatos group is named Manada ("Pack")
A Golondrinas group is named Bandada ("Flock")

Scouts/Guías
(Scouts/Guides) - ages 11 to 15
 Motto: "Siempre Listo" (Always Ready)

A Scouts group is named Tropa ("Troop")
A Guides group is named Compañía ("Company")

Troops and Companies are divided on work teams, of 8 persons, named Patrullas ("Patrols"), led by a Guía de Patrulla ("Patrol Guide").

On this section, boys and girls can achieve some Especialidades ("Specialties"), that are a synonym for Merit Badges.

Pioneros
 Pionero (Pioneers) [ages 15 to 17]
 Motto: "Siempre Adelante" (Always Ahead)
A Pioneros group is named Avanzada ("Advanced")
This groups are subdivided on Comunidades ("Communities"), led by a Coordinador ("Coordinator").

Caminantes
 Caminante (Rovers) [ages 17 to 20]
 Motto: "A servir" (To Serve)
A Caminantes group is named Clan

This groups are subdivided on Equipos ("Teams"), led by a Vocero ("Spokesperson").

Scout Law

Lobatos/Golondrinas
The Lobato/Golondrina:
Knows and takes care of his/her body
Tries to solve his/her problems
Is joyful and tells the truth
Knows how to listen, and says what he/she feels
Is friendly and helps the others
Learns how to know God

Scouts/Guías/Pioneros/Caminantes
The Scout/Guía/Pionero/Caminante:
Is trustworthy
Is loyal
Serves, never expecting a reward
Shares with everyone
Is joyful and cordial
Loves nature, and in nature discovers God
Knows how to obey, and does nothing only half-way
Is optimistic
Takes care of things because he/she values work
Is pure, in thought, speech and work
always kind

Scouting in Easter Island
Scouting also exists on Easter Island, in the Tatauro Mo A Rapa Nui.

International Scout units in Chile 
In addition, there are American Boy Scouts in Santiago, linked to the Direct Service branch of the Boy Scouts of America, which supports units around the world, as well as Girl Scouts of the USA.

External links
Asociación de Guías y Scouts de Chile

World Association of Girl Guides and Girl Scouts member organizations
World Organization of the Scout Movement member organizations
Scouting and Guiding in Chile
Youth organizations established in 1978